The passé simple (simple past,  preterite, or past historic), also called the passé défini (definite past), is the literary equivalent of the passé composé in the French language, used predominantly in formal writing (including history and literature) and formal speech. As with other preterites, it is used when the action has a definite beginning and end and has already been completed. In writing it is most often used for narration.

Constructing the passé simple 

Even though the passé simple is a common French verb tense, used even in books for very young French children, it is usually not taught to foreigners until advanced French classes. The passé simple is most often formed by dropping the last two letters off the infinitive form of the verb and adding the appropriate ending.

The three main classes of French regular verbs (-er, -ir, -re) are conjugated in the passé simple tense in the following way:

Several common irregular verbs:

Many other irregular verbs are easily recognized because the passé simple often resembles the past participle. For example, il courut (he ran) is from courir, for which the past participle is couru. Some, however, are totally irregular. Naitre (to be born) has a past participle né and yet the passé simple is (for example) je naquis ...  (I was born. ... )

How the passé simple is used

The passé simple is used to express:

 an event or action, of long or short duration, that is complete, and over, but not necessarily remote in time:

Le Général de Gaulle vécut 80 ans.
General de Gaulle lived for eighty years.

En 1991, l'équipe de France de tennis gagna la coupe Davis.
In 1991, the French team won the Davis Cup.

 a series of completed events, perceived as points in time:

 ... l'image fut bonne ... cela parut pour son entourage l'essentiel ... on sentit tout de même ... son épouse lui fit signe de ... 
 ... the impression was good ... that seemed to be the essential thing for his entourage ... they felt nevertheless ... his wife signalled to him to ...

 in combination with and in contrast to the imperfect tense, which describes the background of the event or series of events:

Puis, il tourna le robinet de l'évier, se lava les mains, s'essuya au linge accroché sous le grêle tuyau ... Et elle guettait ses moindres gestes ... 
Then he turned on the tap, washed his hands, dried them on the towel hanging under the thin pipe. ... And she watched his slightest movement ...

Modern usage

While literary and refined language still uses the passé simple, the standard ordinary spoken language has renounced passé simple for the passé composé, which means that in spoken French, there is no longer a nuance between:

Passé composé « Je suis arrivé. » ("I have arrived." I have come to town. I may have just arrived.)

and

Passé simple « J'arrivai. » ("I arrived." I came to town, but it is possible that I am not still here.)

Local usage

In modern spoken French, the passé simple has practically disappeared, but localised French has its own variations, like this sample from Langue d'oïl in the North of France where "mangea" is replaced by "mangit":

« Malheureux comme le chien à Brisquet, qui n'allit qu'une fois au bois, et que le loup le mangit. » Unfortunate like Brisquet's dog, who went into the woods only once and whom the wolf ate.

In Canada, the passé simple continues to be used, at least more than in France. It has retained its use due to interactions with English, which has equivalents to both the "passé composé" and the "passé simple".

In modern spoken French, the passé simple is used occasionally as a joke to make the sentence sound either snobbier or more refined, especially after the first or second person plural, which are rarely if ever used in contemporary French, even in writing.

References

Grammatical tenses
French grammar